The guanbi policy or closed port policy was a military blockade policy of the government of the Republic of China (ROC) against the Chinese Communist Party (CCP) in the Communist-controlled Zone and later, the newly-established People's Republic of China (PRC). On 18 June 1949, ROC Government announced the aerial and naval blockade policy along the Chinese coast from Liao River to Min River area starting on 26 June. The application area was extended further southwest to include the Guangdong Province in February 1950.

The Executive Yuan approved another Emergency measure to ban the activities of domestic vessels, crew and the owner companies to the People's Republic of China (PRC) on 16 August 1950., and the complete naval traffic blockade measure on 12 July 1962. Moreover, the Kuomintang government extended the privateering on the foreign vessels regardless even in the international waters. 

New York Times reported that 67 foreign ships were intercepted by the ROC Armed Forces from September 1949 to October 1954, with half of them being British vessels - 141 incidents of interference as per British official statistics.  The Western Enterprise Incorporated (WEI) supported by the Central Intelligence Agency acted a strategic role in the operations. 

Various incidents occurred with tragic ending of human lives and properties lost throughout the following years. It wasn't until 12 September 1979, the naval traffic blockade status ended; and the regulation on the vessels, crew and owner companies was abolished on 15 January 1992.

See also 
 Capture of Tanker Tuapse
 1987 Lieyu massacre
 Min Ping Yu No. 5540 incident
 Min Ping Yu No. 5202

References

External links 
 相关专题——國府關閉大陸專輯
 《封锁大陆沿海──中华民国政府的“关闭政策”，1949-1960》林宏一

Cross-Strait conflict
Cross-Strait relations
Blockades